He Jianbin (Chinese: 何健彬, pinyin: Hé Jiàn Bīn, born February 18, 1993, in Jiangmen, Guangdong) is a Chinese swimmer. At the 2012 Summer Olympics he finished 21st overall in the heats in the Men's 100 metre backstroke and failed to reach the semifinals.

See also
China at the 2012 Summer Olympics - Swimming

References

External links 
 
 
 
 

 
 

1993 births
Living people
Chinese male backstroke swimmers
Swimmers from Guangdong
Olympic swimmers of China
Swimmers at the 2012 Summer Olympics
Swimmers at the 2016 Summer Olympics
Swimmers at the 2010 Summer Youth Olympics
People from Xinhui District
Swimmers at the 2010 Asian Games
Youth Olympic gold medalists for China
Asian Games competitors for China
21st-century Chinese people